The Caribbean Region is a region that competes in the Little League World Series.  The Caribbean region was first given an automatic berth in 2001. Prior to 2001, Caribbean teams competed for a berth in the LLWS in the Latin American region.

A team from Curaçao won the first nine Caribbean championships, until 2010. Curaçao's Pabao Little League won the 2004 Little League World Series, the only title to date for a Caribbean team.

Caribbean Region Countries

Following the 2021 LLWS, Cuba and Puerto Rico, plus the Latin American Region country of Panama, will take up two berths in the LLWS. Two of the three will send champions to the LLWS each year, while the third will compete in its normal region; the automatic berths will rotate annually. This scheme is part of a planned expansion of the LLWS from 16 to 20 teams that was originally scheduled to occur for 2021, but was delayed to 2022 due to COVID-19.

Regional championship

The list below lists each country's participant in the Caribbean Little League Region Tournament. That year's winner is indicated in green.

(DNQ) – Indicates that the country did not have a team qualify in that year's tournament other than being the host.

LLWS results
As of the 2022 Little League World Series.

Results by country
As of the 2022 Little League World Series.

See also
Baseball awards#Americas

References

External links
 Little League Online

Caribbean
Baseball in the Caribbean
Recurring sporting events established in 2001